Giesegaard is a manor house and estate located in Ringsted Municipality in Denmark. The estate is owned by Michael Brockenhuus-Schack and has been owned by members of the Schack/Brockenhuus-Schack family since 1736. The oldest part of the main building was built in 1751 for countess Anna Sophie Schack but it was later expanded by an extra storey in 1847 and adapted in 1873 and again in 1904. It now appears as a two-storey, white-plastered building with two octagonal towers and black-glazed tile roofs. The estate covers 3,115 hectares of land.

History

1668–1719: the Giesegaard family
A village named Skivede was located where Giesegaard stands today until the 1670s. It belonged to the Crown until 1668 when Frederick IV ceded it to Frederik Giese in exchange for land elsewhere. Giese was originally from Husum. He also acquired other land in the area before establishing the manor of Giesegaard in 1683. After his death in 1693, Giesegaard was taken over by his widow Margrethe Elisabeth Schönbach and son Christoffer Joachim Giese.

1719–1736: Scavenius and Gabel
 
Christoffer Joachim Giese died in 1719 and his mother had to cede the estate to her debitor Christian Scavenius. In 1720, he sold it to Christian Carl Gabel. He had been appointed to Chief Secretary of War. He expanded the estate considerably through the acquisition of more land. In 1823, he fell out of favour at the court and was dismissed. He ran into economic difficulties and was forced to obtain a loan from countess Anna Sophie Schack in 1726, the same year that he was appointed to prefect of Ribe County.

1736–present: the Schack family
 
In 1736, Anna Sophie Schack took over Giesegaard when Gabel was unable to pay his debts. She founded  in her will with the effect that the land could not be sold or divided between heirs. The land was heavily mortgaged and Stamhuset Giesegaard could therefore not be established until 1766.

Christian Frederik Schack, the son of Otto Didrik Schack and Anna Ernestine Frederikke née Gabel, inherited the estate in 1760. Knud Bille Schack inherited Stamhuset Giesegaard in 1790. He died on a journey to Karlsruhe in 1821 and Giesegaard was then passed on to his nephew, Henrik Adolph Brockenhuus-Schack, who was made a count the following year.

Brockenhuus-Schack's son, Knud Bille Brockenhuus-Schack, inherited Giesegaard in 1847. His son, Adolph Ludvig Brockenhuus-Schack, became the owner of Giesegaard in 1892.

Large areas of land were also ceded to the state and divided into small holdings. Frederik Knud Bille Brockenhuus-Schack inherited the remaining part of the estate in 1924.

Architecture
A one-storey main building was built for countess Anna Sophie Schack in 1750–1751. It was heightened with an extra storey in 1843. Both sides of the building feature a triangular pediment. The building was in 1873 adapted to the Renaissance Revival style by Theodor Zeltner. He constructed two copper-clad towers, changed the roof and added sandstone decorations. The building was restored under supervision of the architect G. Tvede in 1904. Most of the decorations were removed and the walls were dressed. Most of the associated farm buildings are from 1902.

Today
Giesegaard covers 3115 hectares of which 1,013 hectares is farmland and 1,499 is woodland. In April 2017, DR estimated the value of the estate to DKK 330 million.

Cultural references
Giesegaard has been used as a location in the feature films Komtessen (1961),  (Bedroom Mazurka, 1970),  (1972) and Pigen og drømmeslottet (1974).

List of owners
 (1668–1693) Frederik Giese
 (1693–1719) Margretha Elisabeth Giese née Schönbach 
 (1693–1719) Christopher Joachim Frederiksen Giese
 (1719–1720) Christian Scavenius
 (1720–1736) Christian Carl Gabel
 (1736–1760) Anna Sophie Schack née Rantzau
 (1760–1790) Frederik Christian Schack
 (1790–1821) Knud Bille Schack
 (1821–1847) Henrik Adolph Brockenhuus-Schack
 (1847–1892) Knud Bille Brockenhuus-Schack
 (1892–1924) Adolph Ludvig Brockenhuus-Schack
 (1924–unknown) Frederik Knud Brockenhuus-Schack
 (unknown) Niels Brockenhuus-Schack
 (1999–present) Michael Brockenhuus-Schack

References

External links

 External links

Manor houses in Ringsted Municipality
Buildings and structures associated with the Brockenhuus family